Mamprusi District is a former district council that was located in North East Region, Ghana.

It was created as an ordinary district assembly in the Northern Region in 1975. However on 1988, it was split off into two new district assemblies: East Mamprusi District and West Mamprusi District. The district assembly was located in the northeast part of Northern Region and had Gambaga as its capital town.

References

1989 disestablishments in Africa

North East Region, Ghana

Former districts of Ghana

States and territories disestablished in 1989